The men's 50 metre freestyle competition of the swimming event at the 2015 Southeast Asian Games was held on 8 June at the OCBC Aquatic Centre in Kallang, Singapore.

Records

The following records were established during the competition:

Schedule
All times are Singapore Standard Time (UTC+08:00)

Results

Heats

The heats were held on 8 June.

Heat 1

Heat 1 was held on 8 June.

Heat 2

Heat 2 was held on 8 June.

Final

The final was held on 8 June.

References

External links
 

Men's 50 metre freestyle